Long Long Time Ago (Chinese: 我们的故事; Hokkien: 我儂个故事; POJ: Guá-lâng ê kòo-sīr; literally "Our Story") is a 2016 Singaporean period film directed by Jack Neo. The film commemorates Singapore's 50th birthday and stars Aileen Tan, Mark Lee and Wang Lei as the main casts. It is released on 4 February 2016 in Singapore.

The first film in the Long Long Time Ago film series, it is followed by Long Long Time Ago 2 (2016), The Diam Diam Era (2020) and The Diam Diam Era Two (2021).

Plot
The story spans from 1965 to the early 1970s. Heavily pregnant Zhao Di, the unwanted second wife of an older man, was chased out by her husband's family and forced to return to her own family whom are all living in a kampong. She eventually gave birth to twins, Shun Fa and Su Fang. As Su Fang had two moles on her face, which was said to be bad luck, Zhao Di decided to give her up due to the pressure of wanting to build a better life for the rest of her family.  With Zhao Di's indomitable spirit, and with the help of her family, they went through adversities, witnessed the changes through the years, and accompanied every step of the nation's growth in its early years.

Cast
 Aileen Tan as Lim Zhao Di
 Mark Lee as Lim Ah Kun, Zhao Di's younger brother
 Wang Lei as Si Shu, Zhao Di's father
 Suhaimi Yusof as Osman, a Malay food seller
 Ryan Lian as Ah Long, a gangster
 Benjamin Tan as Lim Ah Hee, Zhao Di's younger brother who is among the first batch of National Servicemen
 Yan Li Xuan as young Su Ting, Zhao Di's eldest daughter
 Ng Suan Loi as Ah Ma, Zhao Di's mother
 Charmaine Sei as Ah Feng, Ah Kun's wife
 Silvarajoo Prakasam as Shamugen, a hawker inspector turned People's Association officer
 Bharathi Rani as Rani, Shamugen's daughter and Ah Hee's love interest
 Nurijah binte Sahat as Fatimah, Osman's wife
Ezekiel Chee
Siaw Ee John
Cruz Tay 
Roy Li
Yan Li Ming
Jack Neo
Irene Kng
Yoo Ah Min
Henry Thia
Cheah Gim Hin
Justin Dominic Misson
Tosh Zhang
Wang Weiliang
Joshua Tan
Jaspers Lai

Production

Casting
To prepare for her role, Aileen Tan had to improve on her Hokkien and learn some Malay. Due to an accident, she chipped her tooth, but Neo forbade her to fix the chipped upper lateral incisor because he said it gave her character a stronger personality. Meanwhile, Wang Lei had to wear prosthetic teeth and facial hair, and dye his hair white to play the role of a 60 to 70-year-old.

Filming
The film was inspired by Neo's own childhood of growing up in Kampong Chai Chee, and some scenes were filmed in Ipoh, Malaysia, especially in Kampung Cina Pusing. Filming started in May 2015, with the first and second film shot back-to-back for over 60 days.

The first and second film's total budget was initially $5 million, but because Neo "wanted to make improvements", he "took a cut from my director's fee to make things happen", as a result, it went up to $6 million. A huge amount of resources was involved in the making, such as the construction of a 30m-by-30m pool that is 1.5m deep to film scenes recreating the 1969 Singapore flood. It also introduced Auro-3D for clearer sounds.

While filming a scene of a sister rescuing her younger brother from a toilet he is stuck in, director Jack Neo insisted on a close-up shot of real faeces to show audiences what toilets in the 1960s were really like. For historical accuracy, Neo also requested actress Aileen Tan to grow her armpit hair for a brief show of it when her character, wearing a sleeveless blouse, raises her arms to tie her hair while working at a coal mine.

Familiar to Vasantham viewers, actress Bharathi Rani plays Rani in her first non-Tamil production.

Music
The theme song for the film, "Our Memories" (我们的回忆), is composed by Matthew Tang with lyrics by Jack Neo and Ivan Ho, and is sung by Getai singers Desmond Ng, Leon Lim, Febe Huang and Sherraine Law.

Reception

Critical reception
Critical reception was mostly positive.

The New Paper gave it a 4/5 rating, calling it a "tender, fitting paean to our hardworking pioneer generation" and finding that compared to his previous movies, "there is no over-sentimentality in this one". inSing also gave it 4/5, praising how the performances of the film's veteran actors, Aileen Tan and Mark Lee, "keep the viewer engrossed, as well as help to lift the heavily plotted and sometimes meandering film". F*** magazine gave the film 3.5/5, surprised to find "a solid, well-assembled film in its own right, with a swashbuckling cast at the top of its game that shows up the Ah Boys...for the acting lightweights that they are".

SINdie noted how although "the inevitable family melodrama in Neo’s films may be [sic] tedious, but that doesn’t dissipate the warmth that drives this project... there is the sense that the people behind Long Long Time Ago are more than collaborators, but rather a collaborative community akin to a family". Whang Yee-Ling of 8 Days awarded it 3.5/5, praising the "strongly played" performances of Aileen Tan, Mark Lee and Wang Lei and calling the film "equal parts heartfelt and calculating in manipulating our lump-in-the-throat nostalgia. It's a winner, the Hokkien dialect especially a treat".

Box office
Long Long Time Ago was released on 4 February 2016 during the Chinese New Year. It topped the local box office in Singapore, grossing $1.65 million in six days, beating films like The Monkey King 2 and The Mermaid. The film managed to gross over $4.13 million at the Singapore box office. Its sequel, Long Long Time Ago 2 was released two month later on 31 March 2016, and grossed over $3.02 million. The total local box office of two films is over $7.1 million.

Sequel
The back-to-back second part of the film, Long Long Time Ago 2, was released on 31 March 2016. The third film, The Diam Diam Era, is released on 26 November 2020. A fourth and final film, The Diam Diam Era Two, is scheduled to be released in February 2021.

References

External links
 

2016 films
Singaporean comedy-drama films
Hokkien-language films
2010s Mandarin-language films
Malay-language films
2010s English-language films
Films shot in Singapore
Films shot in Malaysia
Films set in Singapore
Films directed by Jack Neo